The Dutch Eerste Divisie in the 1965–66 season was contested by 15 teams, one less than in the previous year. This was due to the merger of Enschedese Boys with eredivisie-club SC Enschede, to form FC Twente. Sittardia won the championship.

New entrants
Promoted from the 1964–65 Tweede Divisie:
 SC Cambuur
 Xerxes
Relegated from the 1964–65 Eredivisie:
 NAC Breda
 Sittardia

League standings
Due to the expansion of the eredivisie to eighteen teams, and the expansion of this division to twenty teams next year, more teams were promoted and only one team relegated this year.

See also
 1965–66 Eredivisie
 1965–66 Tweede Divisie

References
Netherlands - List of final tables (RSSSF)

Eerste Divisie seasons
2
Neth